Oleksandr Obrevko was born on 31 May 1984 in the village Frunzivka Poltava Oblast, Ukraine) and is a Ukrainian football midfielder. He is 180 centimeters tall (5'11"). He weighs 76 kilograms (167.5 pounds).

Club history
He has played for FC Kremin Kremenchuk in the Druha Liha B franchise since 2007.

External links
Official team website for FC Kremin Kremenchuk
FC Kremin Kremenchuk Squad

1984 births
Living people
FC Kremin Kremenchuk players
Ukrainian footballers
Association football midfielders